Duilio Beretta and Roberto Quiroz were the defending champions, but they chose not to compete this year.

Andrés Artuñedo and Roberto Carballés won in the final 5–7, 7–6(7–5), [10–5] against Mitchell Krueger and Shane Vinsant.

Seeds

Draw

Finals

Top half

Bottom half

References
 Main Draw

Boys' Doubles
2011